Naxalbari (also spelled Naksalbari) is a village in the Naxalbari CD block in the Siliguri subdivision of the Darjeeling district in the state of West Bengal, India. Naxalbari is famous for being the site of a 1967 revolt that would eventually lead to the Naxalite–Maoist insurgency.

History

Naxalbari became famous for being the site of a left-wing poor peasants uprising in 1967, which began with the "land to tiller" slogan, an uprising continuing to this day (see Naxalite).

The Naxalbari uprising was triggered on 25 May 1967 at Bengai Jote village in Naxalbari when the police opened fire on a group of villagers who were demanding their right to the crops at a particular piece of land. The firing killed 9 adults and 2 unknown children.
 
The CPI (ML) have put up busts of Lenin, Stalin, Mao and Charu Majumder on that piece of land. The spot has Bengai Jote Primary School next to it. There is a memorial column erected that has the names of the people who died during the police firing. The names are 1. Dhaneswari Devi (F), 2. Simaswari Mullick (F), 3. Nayaneswari Mullick (F), 4. Surubala Burman (F), 5. Sonamati Singh (F), 6. Fulmati Devi (F), 7. Samsari Saibani (F), 8. Gaudrau Saibani (M), 9. Kharsingh Mullick (M) and "two children".

Geography

Location
It has an average elevation of 152 metres (501 feet).

The stretch of land, where Naxalbari is situated, lies on the Terai region at the base of the Himalayas. To the west of Naxalbari, across the border river Mechi lies Nepal. The entire stretch of the land surrounding Naxalbari is covered by farmlands, tea estates and forests and small villages consisting of an area of 182.02 km². The Naxalbari block has six Gram Panchayats (village councils), viz. Gossainpur, Lower Bagdogra, Upper Bagdogra, Hatighisha, Naxalbari and Moniram, from north to south. The population of the Naxalbari block was 144,915 in the year 2001.

Area overview
The map alongside shows the Siliguri subdivision of the Darjeeling district. This area is spread across the foothills of the Himalayas and is a plain land gently sloping from north to south. While the northern part is mentioned as the Terai region, the larger southern portion forms the western part of the Dooars region. While 55.11% per cent of the population resides in rural areas, 44.89% resides in urban areas. On the western side, the Mechi River forms a long border with Nepal. On the eastern side the Mahananda River forms a short border with Bangladesh.

Note: The map alongside presents some of the notable locations in the subdivision. All places marked in the map are linked in the larger full-screen map.

Civic Administration

Police station
Naxalbari police station has jurisdiction over the Naxalbari CD block.

CD block HQ
The headquarters of the Naxalbari CD block is at Naxalbari.

Demographics
According to the 2011 Census of India, Naksalbari had a total population of 1,618 of which 811 (50%) were males and 807 (50%) were females. There were 138 persons in the age range of 0 to 6 years. The total number of literate people in Naksalbari was 1,289 (79.67% of the population over 6 years).

Transport
Naxalbari has a railway station on the Katihar–Siliguri line. Daily trains run from New Jalpaiguri via Siliguri Town, Siliguri Junction, Matigara and Bagdogra. There are four trains running from New Jalpaiguri; New Jalpaiguri-Katihar Passenger, New Jalpaiguri-Aluabari-New Jalpaiguri DEMU Ring Rail, New Jalpaiguri-Balurghat DEMU and New Jalpaiguri-Radhikapur DEMU.

There is also a bus service from Siliguri Court More to Naxalbari.

Naxalbari's Panitanki neighbourhood is on Nepal's eastern border with India at Jhapa District, Province No. 1. There is a border crossing to the Kakarbhitta neighbourhood of Mechinagar municipality with a checkpoint for customs and crossing by third-country nationals while citizens of Nepal and India cross without restriction.

Education
Naxalbari has two major government high schools, one for males and one for females, and one college. There are many public and private primary schools.

 Nand Prasad High School - A government boys high school, which runs from class 5th to 12th grade. It was founded in 1943. 
 Nand Prasad Girls High School - A government girls high school, which runs classes from 5th grade to 12th grade. It was founded in 1973.
 Naxalbari Nepali High School - A government co-ed high school, from 05th Grade to 12th Grade. Founded in 1985, it was recognized by the Govt. of W. B. in 2000.
 Naxalbari College - A government college. It was established in 2008.
 Shreema Shishu Udyan School - A private primary school for boys and girls, which runs classes from 1st grade to 5th grade. It was founded in 1979.
Sabuj Sathi Nursery School - A private primary school for boys and girls, which runs classes from pre-nursery to 4th grade. It was founded in 1984. Mrs. Laxmi Ghosh established Shreema Shishu Udyan and Sabuj Sathi Nursery School.
Sarada Vidya Mandir - A private primary school for boys and girls, which runs classes from pre-nursery to 8th grade (increase every year up to 10th). It was established in 1998.
 Sister Margaret English Public School - This school only teaches up to the primary level.
 Raja Rammohan Navodaya Vidyalaya - A private Bengali medium primary level school.

See also
Naxal (disambiguation)

References

External links
The Rising: Naxalbari to now 
From Naxalbari to Nalgonda
The Road from Naxalbari ,Panghata Road, Bhangapool, Bhagilram jote, Lalpool, Rakomjote, Kolabari, Jabra Belgachi, Tirana, Bagdora, Dudhiya, Mirik, Darjeelie

Naxalite–Maoist insurgency
Villages in Darjeeling district
1960s in West Bengal